This was a new event in the 2011 ITF Women's Circuit.
Stéphanie Dubois won the title, defeating Zhang Ling 6–2, 2–6, 6–1 in the final.

Seeds

  Stéphanie Dubois (champion)
  Tetiana Luzhanska (semifinals)
  Julia Glushko (semifinals)
  Zhang Ling (final)
  Sharon Fichman (quarterfinals)
  Chanel Simmonds (second round)
  Hsu Wen-hsin (quarterfinals)
  Sun Shengnan (quarterfinals)

Main draw

Finals

Top half

Bottom half

References
 Main Draw
 Qualifying Draw

Challenger Banque Nationale de Granby
Challenger de Granby